José Antonio Rosas Martínez (born February 27, 1986, in Guadalajara) is a professional Mexican footballer who currently plays for Correcaminos UAT on loan from Dorados de Sinaloa.

References

Correcaminos UAT footballers
1986 births
Living people
Mexican footballers
Association football midfielders
Footballers from Guadalajara, Jalisco
21st-century Mexican people